

Events 
Ginés Pérez de la Parra becomes composer and musical director at Orihuela cathedral.
Marc'Antonio Ingegneri becomes maestro di cappella of Cremona cathedral.

Publications

Music
Lodovico Agostini –  for six voices, book 2 (Venice: Alessandro Gardano)
Costanzo Antegnati –  (motets) for four voices (Brescia: Vincenzo Sabbio)
Giammateo Asola –  (Venice: Angelo Gardano)
Joachim a Burck –   for four voices (Frankfurt: Nikolaus Basse)
Severin Cornet
 for five, six, seven, and eight voices (Antwerp: Christophe Plantin)
 for five, six, and eight voices (Antwerp: Christophe Plantin)
Madrigals for five, six, seven, and eight voices (Antwerp: Christophe Plantin)
Giovanni Dragoni – First book of madrigals for four voices (Venice: heirs of Girolamo Scotto)
Paolo Isnardi
Second book of masses for five voices (Venice: Angelo Gardano)
Third book of madrigals for five voices (Venice: heirs of Girolamo Scotto)
Orlande de Lassus
Masses for four and five voices (Nuremberg: Katharina Gerlach)
Giovanni de Macque –  for six voices (Venice: Angelo Gardano)
Luca Marenzio
First book of madrigals for six voices (Venice: Angelo Gardano)
Second book of madrigals for five voices (Venice: Angelo Gardano)
Rinaldo del Mel – First book of motets for four, five, six, seven, and eight voices (Venice: Angelo Gardano)
Philippe de Monte
Tenth book of madrigals for five voices (Venice: heirs of Girolamo Scotto)
Fourth book of madrigals for four voices (Venice: Angelo Gardano)
Giovanni Maria Nanino & Annibal Stabile – Madrigals for five voices (Venice: Angelo Gardano)
Giovanni Pierluigi da Palestrina — First book of madrigals for five voices
Benedetto Pallavicino – First book of madrigals for five voices (Venice: Angelo Gardano)
Christoph Praetorius –  for four voices (Wittenberg: Matthäus Welack), in two volumes

Other
Fabritio Caroso – , Italian dance manual, containing much dance music
Vincenzo Galilei – Dialogo della musica antica, et della moderna (Dialogue Concerning Ancient and Modern Music)

Classical music 
none listed

Births 
July 2 – Johann Staden, German organist and composer (d. 1634)

Deaths 
May 7 – Alexander Utendal, Flemish composer (born 1543/45)
date unknown – Joachim Thibault de Courville, French composer, singer, lutenist and player of the lyre
probable – Antoine de Bertrand (born 1530/1540)

 
Music
16th century in music
Music by year